Mirsad Huseinovic (born November 26, 1968) is a U.S. soccer player.  He spent one season in the American Professional Soccer League and one game Major League Soccer.  He also earned one cap with the U.S. national team.

Youth and college
Huseinovic moved to the United States from Montenegro with his family when he was five.  His family settled in Brooklyn where he learned to play soccer from his father.  He attended New Utrecht High School, graduating in 1987.  He then attended Brooklyn College from 1988 to 1992 where he played on the men’s soccer team.  While playing with Brooklyn, he also played with several teams in the Cosmopolitan Soccer League (CSL), including Gjoa and the Albanians.

Professional
Huseinovic played at least two years with the Brooklyn Italians, winning the 1991 U.S. Open Cup with them.  In April 1993, the San Diego Sockers selected him in the fourth round of the Continental Indoor Soccer League draft. On April 12, 1995, Huseinovic signed with the New York Centaurs of the American Professional Soccer League (APSL).  While with the Centaurs, he played with his cousin Sadri Gjonbalaj.  On July 4, 1996, the MetroStars of Major League Soccer acquired Huseinovic.  He played one game, a total of 45 minutes, with the MetroStars before being released.  Since then, he has continued to play with the Greek American AA of the Cosmopolitan Soccer League.

National team
Huseinovic earned one cap with the U.S. national team in a scoreless tie with Costa Rica on February 12, 1992. Head coach Bora Milutinović put him on as second-half substitute for Jorge Acosta.

References

1968 births
Living people
People from Plav, Montenegro
Bosniaks of Montenegro
American people of Bosniak descent
American Professional Soccer League players
American soccer players
Brooklyn Italians players
Greek American AA players
New York Red Bulls players
Major League Soccer players
New York Centaurs players
Yugoslav emigrants to the United States
United States men's international soccer players
Association football midfielders
New Utrecht High School alumni
Brooklyn College alumni